N.E.E.T. Recordings was a vanity record label of Sri Lankan English hip hop recording artist M.I.A. as an imprint of Interscope Records in 2008. N.E.E.T. is an acronym for "Not in Education, Employment or Training".

The first artist signed to the label was Baltimore rapper Rye Rye, while A. R. Rahman's Slumdog Millionaire soundtrack was the label's first official release. Seeking to expose new, underground music, M.I.A. signed Baltimore musician Blaqstarr, indie rock band Sleigh Bells and visual artist Jaime Martinez in 2009.

Artists
M.I.A. (founder)
Rye Rye
Blaqstarr
Sleigh Bells
Jaime Martinez

Discography
 M.I.A. -Matangi (2013)
 Blaqstarr -Here We Are (2013)
 Rye Rye -Go! Pop! Bang! (2012)
 Blaqstarr -The Divine EP (2011)
 M.I.A. -Maya (2010)
 M.I.A. -XXXO/XXXO The Remixes/XXXO The Remixes: Part 2 (2010)
 Sleigh Bells - Treats (2010)
 Rye Rye - Never Will Be Mine - The Remixes (2011)
 Rye Rye - Sunshine - The Remixes (2011)
 Rye Rye - "Bang"/Bang - The Remixes (2009)
 A. R. Rahman - Slumdog Millionaire (2008)

See also
 List of record labels
 List of electronic music record labels
 List of hip hop record labels

References

External links
 Official website
 

M.I.A. (rapper)
American record labels
Record labels established in 2008